Stig Axel Fridolf Jägerskiöld (20 April 1911 – 14 September 1997) was a Swedish professor in public law, international law and constitutional law. He was also a historian and a diplomat.

External links
 Dödsfall. Stig Jägerskiöld till minne

Swedish scholars and academics
1911 births
1997 deaths
20th-century Swedish lawyers